Joanna Deborah Bussinger (born 20 July 1993), known professionally as Debrah Scarlett and as of 2019 known under the moniker Red Moon, is a Norwegian-Swiss singer and songwriter. She represented Norway in the Eurovision Song Contest 2015 along with Mørland with the song "A Monster Like Me". She competed on the Norwegian version of The Voice in 2013. Since 2020, she has been releasing music as Red Moon.

Personal life
Scarlett was born in Basel, Switzerland in 1993 to Norwegian parents. They returned to their hometown of Nittedal in Norway when she was six years old. She returned later to Switzerland at the age of ten.

Discography

EPs

Singles

See also
 Norway in the Eurovision Song Contest 2015

Notes

References

External links

Musicians from Basel-Stadt
Eurovision Song Contest entrants of 2015
Eurovision Song Contest entrants for Norway
Norwegian pop singers
Melodi Grand Prix winners
21st-century Swiss women singers
Swiss people of Norwegian descent
Norwegian people of Swiss descent
Living people
1993 births
The Voice (franchise) contestants
21st-century Norwegian women singers
21st-century Norwegian singers